Marcus Hendrikus Guillaume Elisabeth "Marc" Weijzen (born November 5, 1964 in Maastricht) is a Dutch sprint canoer who competed in the early 1990s. At the 1992 Summer Olympics in Barcelona, he was eliminated in the repechages of both the K-2 500 m and the K-2 1000 m event.

References
 Sports-Reference.com profile

1964 births
Canoeists at the 1992 Summer Olympics
Dutch male canoeists
Living people
Olympic canoeists of the Netherlands
Sportspeople from Maastricht